Chehel Dokhtaran castle is a historical castle located in Hamun County in Sistan and Baluchestan Province, The longevity of this fortress dates back to the Sasanian Empire.

References 

Castles in Iran
Sasanian castles